Kerstin Margareta af Jochnick (born March 17, 1958) is a Swedish banker and economist. She is currently serving as a member of the European Central Bank's supervisory board, and was the former First Deputy Governor of the Sveriges Riksbank, the central bank of Sweden.

Early life 
Kerstin af Jochnick graduated with a degree in economics, statistics and law studies from Stockholm University.

Career 
Af Jochnick started her career in 1976 at Sparbanken Kronoberg, a savings bank, before moving to the Riksbank the following year. In 1991 she joined the Swedish financial supervisory authority Finansinspektionen, and in 2004 she joined the Committee of European Banking Supervisors as part of the supporting office. Af Jochnick was appointed Chair of the Committee of European Banking Supervisors in January 2008 and held her position until September 2009, when she was succeeded by Giovanni Carosio.

In December 2011, af Jochnick was appointed as the First Deputy Governor of the Riksbank, under Governor Stefan Ingves, and assumed her position in January 2012. Her term was extended in 2017 to run until the end of 2023, but she left office in July 2019 to assume a new position at the European Central Bank. af Jochnick was succeeded in this position by Cecilia Skingsley (who replaced her as First Deputy Governor) and Anna Breman (who was appointed new Deputy Governor and member of the executive board).

The Governing Council of the European Central Bank appointed af Jochnick as the ECB representative to the Supervisory Board of ECB Banking Supervision, where she has held the position since October 2019.

Other activities 
 Leibniz Institute for Financial Research (SAFE), Member of the Policy Council

References

External links
Kerstin af Jochnick's CV from Sveriges Riksbank

1958 births
Living people
People from Hultsfred Municipality
Swedish bankers
Women bankers
Stockholm University alumni
European Central Bank people
Swedish women economists
21st-century Swedish economists